Elephantomyia westwoodi is a species of limoniid crane fly in the family Limoniidae.

Subspecies
These three subspecies belong to the species Elephantomyia westwoodi:
 Elephantomyia westwoodi adirondacensis Alexander
 Elephantomyia westwoodi antillarum Alexander, 1933
 Elephantomyia westwoodi westwoodi

References

Limoniidae
Articles created by Qbugbot
Insects described in 1869